is a Japanese former professional baseball infielder, and current first squad infield and base coach for the Fukuoka SoftBank Hawks of Nippon Professional Baseball (NPB).

He previously played for the Orix Blue Wave.

Early baseball career
Matsuyama was a classmate and captain of the famous KK duo Kazuhiro Kiyohara and Masumi Kuwata at PL Gakuen High School. In 1985, he hit a walk-off hit in the final game of the 67th Japanese High School Baseball Championship between Ube Commercial High School and PL Gakuen High School in the summer of his junior year, which was considered a great game.

He went on to Aoyama Gakuin University, where he won the 1988 Tohto University Baseball League Fall League championship, the first in 106 years since the team's inception.

Professional career

Active player era
On November 26, 1989, Matsuyamai was drafted fifth overall by the Orix Braves in the  1989 Nippon Professional Baseball draft.

He was a member of the Orix Blue Wave for eight seasons, with a total of 126 games played, a .253 batting average, two home runs, and seven RBI, but was regarded as a defensive specialist.

He retired during the 1998 season.

After retirement
After his retirement, Matsuyama served as the first squad infield and base coach for the Orix Blue Wave from the 1999 to 2001 seasons, the first squad infield and base coach for the  Hanshin Tigers in the 2002 season, and the second squad infield and base coach from the 2003 to 2004 seasons.

He again returned to the Orix Buffaloes for the 2005 season and served as the first squad infield defensive base coach through the 2011 season.

He coached Korea Baseball Organization's the Kia Tigers during the 2012 season.

Matsuyama became the Chiba Lotte Marines' second squad infield defensive base coach in the 2013 season and was the first squad infield defensive base coach from the 2015 to 2017 seasons.

Matsuyama became the Fukuoka SoftBank Hawks' second squad infield defensive base coach for the 2018 season, the third squad infield defensive base coach for the 2021 season, and again the second squad infield defensive base coach for the 2022 season.

He will serve as the first squad infield defensive base coach beginning with the 2023 season.

His enthusiastic coaching is highly regarded by all teams, and he has continued to wear the uniform as a coach since his retirement to the present.

References

External links

 Career statistics - NPB.jp 
 74 Hideaki Matsuyama PLAYERS2022 - Fukuoka SoftBank Hawks Official site 

1967 births
Living people
Baseball people from Wakayama Prefecture 
Aoyama Gakuin University alumni
Japanese baseball players
Nippon Professional Baseball infielders
Orix BlueWave players
Japanese baseball coaches
Nippon Professional Baseball coaches